Matías de los Santos de los Santos (born 22 November 1992) is a Uruguayan professional footballer who plays as a centre-back for Colo-Colo on loan from Vélez Sarsfield.

Career
de los Santos began in the academy of Peñarol, prior to heading off to Almagro Baby Fútbol and Ferro Carril Salto of his hometown. After a further youth stint in the ranks of River Plate, de los Santos' senior career began with Danubio in 2013. He made his pro debut on 25 October in the Primera División, as he came off the bench with fourteen minutes left for Camilo Mayada. In May 2014, de los Santos scored his first goal in a draw with Sud América as Danubio won the 2013–14 title. A total of eighty-three appearances, ten of which arrived in continental competition, came in five years alongside three goals.

On 30 June 2017, de los Santos agreed a loan to Millonarios of Colombia's Categoría Primera A. Two goals came as they won the 2017 Clausura. June 2018 saw Millonarios sign de los Santos permanently. He would move clubs again one year later, though did manage to take his overall tally to eighty-three matches and six goals in the preceding months - winning the 2018 Superliga Colombiana in the process. On 18 July 2019, de los Santos secured a one-year loan move to Argentina with Vélez Sarsfield; with a future purchase option. He made seven total appearances, before returning to Millonarios in June 2020.

However, de los Santos made a return to Vélez Sarsfield in February 2021, signing a deal until the end of 2023.

Career statistics
.

Honours
Danubio
Uruguayan Primera División: 2013–14

Millonarios
Categoría Primera A: 2017 Clausura
Superliga Colombiana: 2018

References

External links

1992 births
Living people
Uruguayan footballers
Uruguayan expatriate footballers
Footballers from Salto, Uruguay
Association football defenders
Uruguayan Primera División players
Categoría Primera A players
Argentine Primera División players
Chilean Primera División players
Danubio F.C. players
Millonarios F.C. players
Club Atlético Vélez Sarsfield footballers
Colo-Colo footballers
Expatriate footballers in Chile
Expatriate footballers in Colombia
Expatriate footballers in Argentina
Uruguayan expatriate sportspeople in Chile
Uruguayan expatriate sportspeople in Colombia
Uruguayan expatriate sportspeople in Argentina